The 2016 Copa Verde was the 3rd edition of the Copa Verde football competition held in Brazil. Featuring 18 clubs, Amazonas and Distrito Federal has two vacancies; Acre, Amapá, Espírito Santo, Goiás, Mato Grosso, Mato Grosso do Sul, Pará, Rondônia, Roraima and Tocantins with one each. The others four berths was set according to CBF ranking.

In the finals, Paysandu defeated Gama 3–2 on aggregate to win their first title and a place in the Round of 16 of the 2017 Copa do Brasil.

Qualified teams

Schedule
The schedule of the competition is as follows.

Preliminary round

|}

Bracket

Finals

Paysandu won 3–2 on aggregate.

References 

Copa Verde
Copa Verde
Copa Verde